Fadela and Sahraoui were an Algerian raï vocal duo, comprising Cheb Sahraoui (born Mohammed Sahraoui, Tlemcen, Algeria, 1 April 1961) and Chaba Fadela (born Fadela Zalmat, Oran, Algeria, 5 February 1962).

They married in 1983.  Their first record together, "N'sel Fik", became an international hit, and was followed by further record successes and tours, including tours of the USA in 1990 and 1993.  While in New York they recorded the album "Walli" with producer and multi-instrumentalist Bill Laswell.  They relocated from Algeria to France in 1994, but separated in the late 1990s.  Both have continued to work as solo artists.

References

Algerian musicians
Raï musicians